Bellator 279: Cyborg vs. Blencowe 2 was a mixed martial arts event produced by Bellator MMA held on April 23, 2022, at the Neal S. Blaisdell Arena in Honolulu, Hawaii, United States.

Background 

The main event featured Bellator Women's Featherweight Champion Cris Cyborg defending her title in a rematch against Arlene Blencowe.

As the start of the $1-million Bellator Bantamweight World Grand Prix, the opening round was originally set to start with reigning Bellator Bantamweight Champion Sergio Pettis facing off against former teammate Raufeon Stots, while former champion Kyoji Horiguchi faced Patchy Mix. However, Pettis was forced to pull out of the bout and the Grand Prix after sustaining an injury that required surgery, resulting in Juan Archuleta taking his place and the bout instead being held for the Interim Bellator Bantamweight Championship.

At the weigh-ins, Whittany Pyles missed weight for her bout, weighing in at 127.4 pounds, 1.4 pounds over the flyweight non-title fight limit. The bout proceeded at catchweight and Pyles was fined a percentage of her purse which went to her opponent Sumiko Inaba.

Results

See also 

 2022 in Bellator MMA
 List of Bellator MMA events
 List of current Bellator fighters
 Bellator MMA Rankings

References 

Sports competitions in Honolulu
Bellator MMA events
2022 in mixed martial arts
April 2022 sports events in the United States
2022 in sports in Hawaii
Mixed martial arts in Hawaii
Sports competitions in Hawaii